Norman Edward Tate  (1890–1962) was a notable New Zealand entertainer. He was born in Papakura, New Zealand, in 1890.

In the 1959 Queen's Birthday Honours, Tate was appointed a Member of the Order of the British Empire, for social welfare services.

References

1890 births
1962 deaths
New Zealand clowns
People from Papakura
New Zealand Members of the Order of the British Empire